Bamafélé  is a town and commune in the Cercle of Bafoulabé in the Kayes Region of south-western Mali. In the 2009 census the commune had a population of 13,622.

References

External links
 Bamafele at csa-mali.org

Communes of Kayes Region